The SpaceLoft XL is a sounding rocket developed by private spaceflight company UP Aerospace. The rocket is capable of lofting a 79 lb (36 kg) payload to a sub-orbital trajectory with an apogee of about 71.5 miles (115 km). It takes only 60 seconds to cross the Kármán line (the official "edge of space" at 100 km).  All launches are sub-orbital, so that they do not complete one orbital revolution.  Launches are conducted from the company launch facility at Spaceport America in Upham, New Mexico.

Description
The rocket is 20 feet (6 m) long and 10 inches (25 cm) in diameter, and consists of a single stage powered by a single solid fuel rocket engine. Typical flights last about 13 minutes, with more than 4 minutes of weightlessness. The rocket is reportedly capable of reaching up to 225 km (140 miles) altitude, though its standard apogee is closer to 115 km (71 miles).

To give an idea about the cost and time requirements of the rocket, in 2021 a SpaceLoft XL suborbital mission contracted by Los Alamos National Laboratory cost $1 million and took 11 months to realize from contract signing to flight (15 months from concept to flight).

Launches
The first launch, SL-1 was made at 2:14 p.m. local time (20:14 UTC) on September 25, 2006, from Spaceport America.
During its maiden flight, it experienced an "unexpected aerodynamic effect" and crashed in the New Mexico desert after reaching only 40,000 feet (12 km).

The second launch, SL-2 originally scheduled for October 21, 2006, was successfully carried out on April 28, 2007, at 8:56 a.m. local time (14:56 UTC). UP Aerospace president Jerry Larson had said the rocket was assembled and had been on the launch rail since Tuesday (24 April).  The primary payload, Celestis Legacy, consisted of cremated human remains including those of astronaut Gordon Cooper and Star Trek actor James Doohan, whose ashes were also on board the ill-fated Falcon 1 when it malfunctioned in August 2008.

As of 13 September 2021, UP Aerospace has conducted a total of 19 launches, including 14 with SpaceLoft XL rockets, most of which have been successful. The third launch, which was conducted at 14:00 UTC on 2 May 2009, carrying student experiments and the Discovery payload for Celestis, had an electronic anomaly causing an early separation and failed to reach the correct apogee.
To date, the highest altitude achieved by the rocket was reached by SL-9, which set a Spaceport America altitude record of 77.25 miles (124 km) on October 23, 2014.

See also
Sounding rocket
List of UP Aerospace launches
Black Brant rocket
Skylark (rocket)

References

Sounding rockets of the United States